Aleixo may refer to:

Aleixo de Abreu (1568–1630), Portuguese physician and tropical pathologist
Aleixo de Menezes (1559–1617), Archbishop of Goa, Archbishop of Braga, Portugal, and Spanish viceroy of Portugal
Éder Aleixo de Assis (born 1957), former Brazilian footballer
Fonte Aleixo, village on the island of Fogo, Cape Verde
Pedro Aleixo (1901–1975), Vice-President of Brazil 1967–1969
São Miguel do Aleixo, municipality located in the Brazilian state of Sergipe

Portuguese-language surnames